Radio Majevica is a Bosnian local commercial radio station, broadcasting from Lopare, Bosnia and Herzegovina. This radio station broadcasts a variety of programs such as folk and turbo-folk music with local news.

Program is mainly produced in Serbian language at one FM frequency (Lopare ) and it is available in Lopare near Bijeljina as well as in nearby municipalities in Semberija area.

Before broadcasting on their own FM frequency, in 2014, in order to inform the citizens about the latest developments, the Municipality of Lopare, in cooperation with the Municipality of Ugljevik, implemented a project for the exchange of content between Radio Skala and Radio Majevica. Every Sunday from 12:00 to 14:00 on the waves of Skala Radio from the studio of Radio Majevica listeners can hear the latest news and information from the Municipality of Lopare.

After BHRT has abandoned the launch of the BH Radio 2 program in 2019, reserved frequencies were allocated to other interested stations across Bosnia and Herzegovina through the competition where company „KRISTAL INŽINJERING“ d.o.o. Lopare met the criteria and it received own FM frequency and increased their coverage.

The owner of the local radio station is the company Radio Kristal d.o.o. Lopare.

Estimated number of listeners of Radio Majevica is around 16.511.

Frequencies
 Lopare

See also 
 List of radio stations in Bosnia and Herzegovina
 Daš Radio
 Daš Extra Radio
 BN Radio
 Bobar Radio
 Bobar Radio - Studio B2
 Radio Slobomir
 Radio Skala

References

External links 
 www.radiomajevica.com
 www.radiostanica.ba
 www.fmscan.org
 Communications Regulatory Agency of Bosnia and Herzegovina

Lopare
Lopare
Mass media in Bijeljina